Espérance cycliste Sartrouville Triathlon or ECS Triathlon is a French sports club based in the suburbs of Paris, commune of Sartrouville. The club's specialization is triathlon for elite level athletes, especially Olympians. Team members have won a total of eight Olympic medals, including the gold medals in male and female triathlon at the 2016 Summer Olympics, and gold, silver, and bronze medals in male triathlon at the 2012 Summer Olympics.

History

Espérance cycliste Sartrouville Triathlon was founded in 1993 by Pierre Veron as a section of the cycling club Espérance cycliste Sartrouville. Veron led the team until his death in 2009, after which leadership passed to his son, Denis Veron.

A female team was created in 2000. In 2016, 18 team members participated in Triathlon at the 2016 Summer Olympics.

Green team
The elite level team is known as The Green Team, because of their green colored uniforms.

Former members :
 David Hauss  
 Alessia Orla 
 Richard Murray  , participating to Rio 2016 olympics

References

Triathlon in France
Cycling teams based in France
Sartrouville